The Coast of Colorado is the debut studio album by American country music artist Skip Ewing. It was released on April 4, 1988 via MCA Records. The album includes the singles "Your Memory Wins Again", "I Don't Have Far to Fall", "Burnin' a Hole in My Heart", "The Gospel According to Luke" and the title track, all of which reached the top 20 on the Billboard Hot Country Singles & Tracks chart.

"Don't Mind If I Do" was previously recorded by George Strait on his 1988 album If You Ain't Lovin' You Ain't Livin'. "Lighter Shade of Blue" was covered by Shelby Lynne on her 1991 album Soft Talk and Reba McEntire on her 1993 album It's Your Call. "Autumn's Not That Cold" was covered by Lorrie Morgan on her 1991 album Something in Red. "Still Under the Weather" was covered by Andy Williams on his 1991 album Nashville and Shania Twain on her 1993 self-titled debut album.

Track listing

Personnel
Adapted from liner notes.

Skip Ewing - lead vocals
Mike Geiger - background vocals
David Hungate - bass guitar
Kirk "Jelly Roll" Johnson - harmonica 
Mike Lawler - synthesizer
Claire Lynch - background vocals
Rick Marotta - drums
Woody Mullis - background vocals
Matt Rollings - piano
Billy Joe Walker Jr. - acoustic guitar, electric guitar
Curtis "Mr. Harmony" Young - background vocals
Reggie Young - electric guitar

Charts

Weekly charts

Year-end charts

Singles

References

1988 debut albums
Skip Ewing albums
MCA Records albums
Albums produced by Jimmy Bowen